John Wills may refer to:

 John Wills (academic administrator) (died 1806), English academic administrator at the University of Oxford
 John Wills (architect) (1846–1906), English architect based in Derby
 John Wills (politician) (born 1966), Iowa State Representative